Prosthetic makeup also called special make-up effects and FX prosthesis) is the process of using prosthetic sculpting, molding and casting techniques to create advanced cosmetic effects. Prosthetic makeup goes back to the beginning of film making with Le Voyage dans La Lune, a 1902 French adventure short film directed by Georges Méliès where the man on the moon effect was accomplished using a combination of makeup and a prosthetic type mask with added pastes. The makeup artist Jack Pierce was another early Hollywood make-up artist, best remembered for creating the iconic makeup worn by Boris Karloff in Frankenstein, his makeup for the Wolfman, and more. Modern prosthetic makeup was revolutionized by John Chambers, whose work can be seen in Planet of the Apes as well as Dick Smith's work in Little Big Man, Stan Winston in the Terminator series, and Rob Bottin in The Thing.

Many of the techniques developed during that period are still regularly used in the field today. Additionally, many of these artists taught and inspired the next generation of Special Effects makeup artists, who in turn developed more advanced techniques for effects makeup, including developing different materials, animatronics and incorporating added computer elements.

Technique

The process of creating a makeup prosthetic appliance typically begins with concept art, created by the artist or production. Once the actor has been chosen, the effects artist will prepare the actor for the process of taking a mold of the actor's face, head or body part. This process is called lifecasting. Lifecast molds are made from prosthetic alginate or more recently, from skin-safe platinum silicone rubber. This initial mold can be relatively weak but flexible. A hard mother mold, also known as a jacket or matrix, is typically made of plaster or fiberglass which is created over the outside of the initial flexible mold to provide support. This mold is used to cast a copy of that part of the actor, in a hard resin or plaster type material to eventually use as a base for sculpting the prosthetic. This is considered a "positive" or lifecast. 

Before sculpting the clay prosthetic over the positive, The positive must be prepared by adding "keys" or mold points along the edges of it, which are often added using clay or more plaster or carved into the lifecast, to make sure that the two pieces of the mold will fit together correctly. Often the lifecast will be given an additional border in clay or plaster in order to have an area free of detail and undercuts to add these keys. The entire lifecast with borders and keys included is then molded. This ensures a stable area with built in keys to sculpt the prosthetic over. This also provides the artist an easily duplicated copy, if needed. Multiple copies are typically used to make variations or stages of prosthetics or different prosthetics for the same actor. 

Lifecasts of full bodies and body parts are also used and reused as the basis for making fake body parts, severed limbs, and various "gore" type effects used in horror films or films where body parts are required. 

The prosthetic required will be sculpted over the lifecast of that body part to become the design intended. For example, if the desired look is a pig nosed person then the artist would sculpt the pig nose over the actors real nose on the lifecast or positive copy. The edges of the clay should be made as thin as possible, for the clay is a stand-in for what will eventually be the prosthetic piece. Once sculpted, the new addition of the clay sculpted prosthetic part must be molded. Since the positive has been prepared with the additional boarder and keys, it actually becomes part of the prosthetic mold itself. Once molded, and clay removed, new mold cleaned out, the positive is one part of the mold and the new mold is the other side which has the negative of the newly sculpted prosthetic. This gives two or more pieces of a mold - a positive of the face or body part, and one (or more for complex molds) "negative" mold piece(s) with prosthetic sculpted in. 

To make the new prosthetic, material is cast into the mold cavity (where the clay used to be). The prosthetic material can be foam latex, gelatin, silicone or other similar materials. The prosthetic is cured within the two part mold. The prosthetic is carefully removed and prepared for painting and or application to the actor.

Conflict with CGI 
As the film/television industry continues to grow, so do the capabilities of the technologies behind it. Since the debut of newer technologies, many have feared that CGI (Computer Generated Imagery) will put practical SFX makeup out of business. CGI can be used to accomplish effects that simply aren't possible when working in practical effects. 

Tom Woodruff Jr. and Alec Gillis, two experienced SFX artists from Amalgamated Dynamics near L.A., share what they see as the middle ground on the subject. In an interview, they explain that most movies use (out of necessity) a combination of practical effects and CGI. They see CGI as a tool that can be utilized in a good way or a bad way, just like practical effects. Tom Savini (an SFX artist known for his work in Dawn of the Dead and Creepshow) states: "They still use the make-up guys to design the creatures and that’s what they work from. I don’t think you’ll see make-up effects guys hanging out on corners with signs that say: WILL DO EFFECTS FOR FOOD.”

Real-world use 
Moulage is a process in which makeup is used to simulate different wounds and trauma in order to prepare medical, emergency, and military personnel for what they could experience in the field and lessen psychological trauma.

Other real world uses are to create real disguises for Government agencies such as the F.B.I., C.I.A., Department of Justice, used to infiltrate possible terrorist groups. Special effects artists can create and apply special effects makeup prosthetics to undercover agents to gather intelligence for combating international terrorism. Disguises let officers and agents move around as another person to complete undercover work without jeopardizing their actual identity.

Another real word use of prosthetics is the appearance of wounds to emulate death to be used by agencies such as the police departments to make someone appear as the victim of a murder during " hit or murder for hire " stings. If a suspect hires a hit-man (killer) to murder someone, the police are able to stage a set of pictures or video to make the suspect believe that the "hit" or murder has been carried out. These situations are made to gather evidence on the suspect before the actual crime of murder has been committed.

Notable artists

 Lon Chaney (The Hunchback of Notre Dame, The Phantom of the Opera, London After Midnight)
 Jack Pierce (Frankenstein (1931), The Mummy (1932), The Wolf Man (1941)
 John Chambers (Planet of the Apes original film series)
 Dick Smith (Little Big Man,  The Godfather, The Exorcist)
 Rick Baker (An American Werewolf in London, The Nutty Professor, Men in Black, How the Grinch Stole Christmas, The Wolfman (2010)
 Tom Savini (Friday the 13th, Dawn of the Dead, Creepshow)
 Rob Bottin (The Howling, The Thing, Total Recall)
 Stan Winston (The Terminator, Predator, Jurassic Park)
Ve Neill (Beetlejuice, Mrs. Doubtfire, Ed Wood, Edward Scissorhands, Pirates of the Caribbean, The Hunger Games)
Michael Westmore (Star Trek: The Next Generation, Star Trek: Deep Space Nine, Star Trek: Voyager, Star Trek: Enterprise, Raging Bull, Rocky, The Munsters)
 Gregory Nicotero (The Walking Dead)
 Howard Berger (The Chronicles of Narnia film series)
Matthew W. Mungle (Albert Nobbs, The Butler, CSI: Crime Scene Investigation, Edward Scissorhands, Bram Stoker’s Dracula)

Notable examples

 Tyra Banks - ABC News: Tyra Banks Experiences Obesity Through Fat Suit - showcased on her eponymous talk show on 4 November 2005
 Jennie Bond: Posh Swap: Jennie Bond (makeup process)
 Nina Bott:  fat makeup (before and after; makeup process).
 Vicki Butler-Henderson: Celebrity Swap. :(Vicki's entire head is covered with prosthetics during the makeup application.)
 Jim Carrey: How the Grinch Stole Christmas (2000) (Grinch makeup)
 Samantha Fox: Race Swap and makeup process.
 Julie Goodyear: Age Swap and makeup application.
 Tommy Lee Jones: Harvey Dent/Two-Face in Batman Forever.
 Rebecca Loos: Gender Swap and makeup application.
 Kelly Lynch: [Mr Magoo] (various disguises, the old lady and makeup application, the balding man).
 James McAvoy among others in The Chronicles of Narnia: The Lion, the Witch and the Wardrobe.
 Rik Mayall: Drop Dead Fred
 Melinda Messenger: Celebrity Swap. (The makeup application for Melinda)
 Jack Nicholson: Jack Napier/The Joker in Batman (1989 film).
 Ron Perlman: several times in his career, but most notably as Hellboy
 Brad Pitt: The Curious Case of Benjamin Button
 Katie Price (a.k.a. Jordan): Jordan Gets Even and makeup application.
 Linda Robson: Celebrity Swap. (Linda's makeup application)
 Arnold Schwarzenegger: as iterations of the Terminator in The Terminator and its sequels Terminator 2: Judgment Day and Terminator 3: Rise of the Machines.
 Carol Smillie: Gender Swap and makeup application.
 Lea Thompson: A Will Of Their Own; Back To The Future Part II and Back To The Future (including makeup application).

See also
 Make-up artist
 Special effect
 Animatronics
 Facial prosthetic

References

 
 
 

Special effects
Cosmetics
Stagecraft
Prosthetics